East Coast Heat Futsal Club is an Australian futsal club based in Sydney, NSW. They play in the F-League which is the top tier of Australian Futsal. The club was founded by Jamie Amendolia and futsalroo Peter Spathis in 2012.

Notable players
 Aaron Cimitle (Futsalroos representative)
 Roberto Maiorana (Futsalroos representative)
 Peter Spathis (Futsalroos representative)
 Chris Zeballos (Futsalroos representative)
 Shervin Adeli (Futsalroos representative)
 Grant Lynch (Futsalroos representative)
 Jordan Guerreiro (Futsalroos representative)

References

External links
F-League official website
Official website

Futsal clubs in Australia
Futsal clubs established in 2012
2012 establishments in Australia
Sporting clubs in Sydney